City Dreamers is a Canadian documentary film, directed by Joseph Hillel and released in 2018. The film focuses on Phyllis Lambert, Blanche Lemco van Ginkel, Cornelia Oberlander and Denise Scott Brown, four significant innovators in contemporary architecture who were among the first prominent women architects.

The film premiered in November 2018 at the Montreal International Documentary Festival, before going into wider release in 2019.

The film received a Canadian Screen Award nomination for Best Cinematography in a Documentary at the 8th Canadian Screen Awards in 2020.

References

External links 
 

2018 films
Canadian documentary films
Documentary films about architecture
Documentary films about women
2010s English-language films
2010s Canadian films